Luther Boyd Eubanks (July 31, 1917 – January 21, 1996) was a United States district judge of the United States District Court for the Western District of Oklahoma.

Education and career

Born in Caprock, New Mexico, Eubanks received a Bachelor of Arts degree from the University of Oklahoma in 1940 and a Bachelor of Laws from the University of Oklahoma College of Law in 1942. He was a technician in the United States Army during World War II, from 1942 to 1945. He was a county attorney of Cotton County, Oklahoma from 1946 to 1949, and was a member of the Oklahoma House of Representatives from 1949 to 1952. He was in private practice in Walters, Oklahoma from 1950 to 1956. He was a Judge of the District Court of Oklahoma in Lawton from 1956 to 1965.

Federal judicial service

Eubanks was nominated by President Lyndon B. Johnson on July 19, 1965, to the United States District Court for the Western District of Oklahoma, to a new seat authorized by 71 Stat. 586. He was confirmed by the United States Senate on August 11, 1965, and received his commission on August 11, 1965. He served as Chief Judge from 1982 to 1986. He assumed senior status on June 30, 1986. His service terminated on August 31, 1987, due to his retirement.

Death

Eubanks died on January 21, 1996, in Oklahoma City, Oklahoma.

References

Sources
 

1917 births
1996 deaths
Oklahoma state court judges
20th-century Members of the Oklahoma House of Representatives
Judges of the United States District Court for the Western District of Oklahoma
United States district court judges appointed by Lyndon B. Johnson
20th-century American judges
United States Army soldiers
20th-century American politicians
Democratic Party members of the Oklahoma House of Representatives